This article lists Wikipedia articles about members of the Social Credit Party of Canada in the House of Commons of Canada

1935
17 MPs elected (15 Alberta, 2 Saskatchewan)

John Horne Blackmore - Lethbridge, Alberta, party leader (1935–1944) elected 1935-1940 re-elected as New Democracy, re-elected as SC 1945-1949-1953-1957, def 1958
Otto Buchanan Elliott -  Kindersley, Saskatchewan, elected 1935
Robert Fair -  Battle River, Alberta, elected 1935-1940 re-elected as New Democracy, re-elected as SC 1945-1949-1953 (died 1954)
William Samuel Hall - Edmonton East, Alberta, elected 1935 (died 1938, SC won by-election)
Ernest George Hansell - Macleod, Alberta,  elected 1935-1940-1945-1949-1953-1957, def 1958
William Hayhurst -  Vegreville, Alberta, elected 1935, def 1940 as New Democracy in Athabaska
Norman Jaques - Wetaskiwin, Alberta,  elected 1935-1940-1945 (died 1949)
Charles Edward Johnston - Bow River, Alberta, elected 1935-1940-1945-1949-1953-1957, def 1958
Walter Frederick Kuhl - Jasper—Edson, Alberta, elected 1935-1940 re-elected as New Democracy re-elected as SC 1945 as Social Credit, def 1949
John Charles Landeryou - Calgary East, Alberta, elected 1935, def 1940
James Alexander Marshall - Camrose, Alberta, elected 1935-1940-1945
Archibald Hugh Mitchell - Medicine Hat, Alberta, elected 1935, def 1940 as New Democracy
Joseph Needham - The Battlefords, Saskatchewan, elected 1935, def 1940
René-Antoine Pelletier - Peace River, Alberta, elected, 1935, def 1940 New Democracy
Eric Joseph Poole - Red Deer, Alberta, elected 1935
Victor Quelch - Acadia, Alberta, elected 1935-1940-1945-1949-1953-1957
Percy John Rowe - Athabaska, Alberta, elected, 1935, def 1940

1938 by-election
switch

Orvis A. Kennedy - Edmonton East, elected by-1938 (replacing Hall), def 1940 as New Democracy

1940 election
11 MPs elected (17-8+2)

In the 1940 federal election many Social Credit Party MPs ran for re-election under the New Democracy party led by former Conservative William Duncan Herridge as part of a joint effort. All 3 New Democracy candidates elected were Social Credit incumbents, Social Credit leader John Horne Blackmore and MPs Walter Frederick Kuhl and Robert Fair. The three continued to sit with the Social Credit Party following the election.

Anthony Hlynka - Vegreville, Alberta, elected 1940-1945, def 1949 
Frederick Davis Shaw -  Red Deer, Alberta, elected 1940-1945-1949-1953-1957, def 1958

1945 election
13 MPs elected

Patrick Harvey Ashby -  Edmonton East, Alberta, elected 1945, def 1949
Solon Earl Low - Peace River, Alberta, party leader (1944–1961), elected 1945-1949-1953-1957, def 1958
William Duncan McKay Wylie - Medicine Hat, Alberta, elected 1945-1949-1953

1946 by-election
+1
Réal Caouette - Pontiac, Quebec, elected by1946, def 1949 in Villeneuve as Union of Electors, ret. 1962-1963-1965 Témiscamingue 1968-1972-1974 (died 1976)

1949 election
10 MPs elected

Hilliard Harris William Beyerstein -  Camrose, Alberta, elected 1949
Ray Thomas - Wetaskiwin, Alberta, elected 1949-1953-1957, def 1958

1953 election
16 MPs elected

Frederick George Hahn - New Westminster, British Columbia, elected 1953-1957, def 1958
Ambrose Holowach - Edmonton East, Alberta, elected 1953-1957, def 1958
Bert Raymond Leboe - Cariboo, British Columbia, elected 1953-1957, def 1958, ret. 1962-1963-1965, def 1968
George William McLeod - Okanagan—Revelstoke, British Columbia, elected 1953-1957, def 1958
Alexander Bell Patterson - Fraser Valley, British Columbia, elected 1953-1957, def 1958, ret. 1962-1963-1965, def 1968, ret. as Progressive Conservative 1972-1974-1979-1980
James Alexander Smith - Battle River—Camrose, Alberta, elected 1953-1957, def 1958
Charles Yuill - Jasper—Edson, Alberta, elected 1953-1957, def 1958

1957 election
19 MPs elected

Frank Claus Christian - Okanagan Boundary, British Columbia, elected 1957
Thomas Irwin -  Burnaby—Richmond, British Columbia, elected 1957, def 1958
Horace Andrew (Bud) Olson - Medicine Hat, Alberta, elected 1957, def 1958 ret. 1962-1963-1965, change to Liberal 1968, def 1972
Peter Stefura - Vegreville, Alberta, elected 1957, def 1958
Sydney Herbert Stewart Thompson - Edmonton—Strathcona, Alberta, elected 1957, def 1958

1958 election
19-19=0

1962 election
30 MPs (26 Quebec, 2 Alberta, 2 British Columbia)

Jean Robert Beaulé -  Quebec East, elected 1962-1963 def 1965 as RC
Louis-Philippe-Antoine Bélanger  - Charlevoix, Quebec, elected 1962-1963
André Bernier - Richmond—Wolfe, Quebec, elected 1962, def 1963
Pierre-André Boutin - Dorchester, Quebec, elected 1962-1963, def 1965 as RC
Gérard Chapdelaine - Sherbrooke, Quebec, elected 1962-1963, def 1965 as Independent
Jean-Paul Cook - Montmagny—l'Islet, Quebec, elected 1962, def 1963
Maurice Côté - Chicoutimi, Quebec, elected 1962-1963, def 1965 as Independent
Charles-Eugène Dionne -  Kamouraska, Quebec, elected 1962-1963, re-elected as RC 1965-1968, re-elected as SC 1972-1974, def 1979
Bernard Dumont -  Bellechasse, Quebec, elected 1962, def 1963, ret. 1968, def 1974
Jean-Louis Frenette - Portneuf, Quebec, elected 1962-1963, def 1965 as Independent
Philippe Gagnon - Rivière-du-Loup—Témiscouata, Quebec, elected 1962, def 1963
Charles-Arthur Gauthier - Roberval, Quebec, elected 1962-1963, re-elected as RC 1965-1968, re-elected as SC 1972-1974-1979, def 1980
Gilles Grégoire -  Lapointe, Quebec, elected 1962-1963, re-elected as RC 1965
Gérard Lamy - Saint-Maurice—Laflèche, Quebec, elected 1962, def 1963
Raymond Langlois - Mégantic, Quebec, elected 1962-1963, re-elected as RC 1965, def 1968
Gérard Laprise - Chapleau, Quebec, elected 1962-1963, re-elected as RC 1965 in Abitibi re-elected 1968, re-elected as SC 1972-1974
Henry P. Latulippe - Compton—Frontenac, Quebec, elected 1962-1963, re-elected as RC 1965-1968, re-elected as SC 1972, def 1974
Marcel Lessard - Lac-Saint-Jean, Quebec, elected 1962-1963, def as Independent 1965, ret as Liberal 1968-1972-1974-1979
Lauréat Maltais - Saguenay, Quebec, elected 1962, def 1963
Guy Marcoux - Québec—Montmorency, Quebec, elected 1962-1963, def 1965 as Independent
David Ouellet - Drummond—Arthabaska, Quebec, elected 1962, def 1963  
Gérard Perron - Beauce, Quebec, elected 1962-1963, def 1965 as RC
Lucien Plourde - Quebec West, Quebec, elected 1962-1963, def 1965 as RC
Gilbert F. Rondeau -Shefford, Quebec, elected 1962-1963, def 1965 as RC, ret 1968, re-elected as SC 1972-1974, def as Independent 1979
J.-Aurélien Roy - Lévis, Quebec, elected 1962, def 1963
Robert N. Thompson - Red Deer, Alberta, party leader (1961–1967), elected 1962-1963-1965, re-elected 1968 as Prog. Con., def 1972 in Surrey—White Rock, British Columbia

1963 election
24 MPs.

Shortly after this election the party split into two camps, the Quebec-based Ralliement Créditiste led by Réal Caouette and consisting of 16 of the 19 Quebec Social Credit MPs and the Alberta-based Social Credit led by Robert N. Thompson. See Social Credit Party of Canada split, 1963

Gérard Girouard - Labelle, Quebec, elected 1963, def 1965 in Hull as Prog. Con.
Gérard Ouellet - Rimouski, Quebec, elected 1963, def 1965 as Prog. Con.

1965 election
Party split 9 Ralliement Créditiste (Quebec); 5 Social Credit (2 Alberta, 3 British Columbia)

Howard Earl Johnston (SC) - Okanagan—Revelstoke, British Columbia, 1965, def 1968, ret 1974 as Prog. Con.
Roland Godin (R. Cr.) - Portneuf, Quebec, 1965–1968, re-elected 1972 as SC, def 1974
Joseph Alcide Simard (R. Cr.) - Lac-Saint-Jean, Quebec, elected 1965, def 1968	 
  
1968 election
14 Ralliement Créditiste; 0 Social Credit

Léonel Beaudoin - Richmond, Quebec, elected 1968, re-elected as SC 1972-1974
André-Gilles Fortin - Lotbinière, Quebec, party leader (1976–1977), elected 1968, re-elected as SC 1972-1974 (died 1977)
Joseph Adrien Henri Lambert - Bellechasse, Quebec, elected 1968, re-elected as SC 1972-1974-1979, def 1980
René Matte - Champlain, Quebec, elected 1968, re-elected as SC 1972-1974, def as Independent 1979
Romuald Rodrigue - Beauce, Quebec, elected 1968, def as SC 1972
Oza Tétrault - Villeneuve, Quebec, elected 1968, re-elected as SC 1972

1972 election
15 (party reunited but all MPs elected are from Quebec)

Eudore Allard - Rimouski, Quebec, elected 1972-1974-1979, def 1980
Jean-Marie Boisvert-  Drummond, Quebec, elected 1972, def 1974
Gilles Caouette - Charlevoix, Quebec, elected 1972, def 1974, ret from Témiscamingue in 1977by, def 1979

1974 election
13 (Quebec only)

Armand Caouette - Villeneuve, Quebec, elected 1974, def in Abitibi 1979

1978 by-election

Richard Janelle - Lotbinière, Quebec, elected 1978-1979 def as Progressive Conservative 1980

1979 election
6 (Quebec only)

Fabien Roy - Beauce, Quebec, party leader (1979–1980), elected 1979, def 1980

1980 election
0

No Social Credit MPs were elected in 1980 or subsequently.

See also
Canadian social credit movement

 
Social Credit Créditistes MPs